This is a list of seasons completed by the New Orleans VooDoo. The VooDoo are a professional arena football franchise of the Arena Football League (AFL), based in New Orleans, Louisiana. The team was established in 2004. In the aftermath of Hurricane Katrina in 2006, the team was forced to suspend operations due to the damage suffered by New Orleans Arena, where the VooDoo played their home games. In October 2008, before the AFL announced it would suspend operations and cancel the 2009 season, the VooDoo folded. The reasons given for the team's dissolution were "circumstances affecting the league and the team."

Prior to the 2011 season, the Bossier–Shreveport Battle Wings relocated to New Orleans and assumed the history of the VooDoo franchise.

References
General
 

Specific

Arena Football League seasons by team
 
New Orleans-related lists
Louisiana sports-related lists